The following lists events that happened in 2013 in Finland.

Incumbents
President – Sauli Niinistö 
Prime Minister – Jyrki Katainen
Speaker – Eero Heinäluoma

Events
30 January – the Jyväskylä library stabbing
15-18 November – the 2013 Nordic storms hit Finland

Deaths

29 January – Anselm Hollo, poet and translator (b. 1934)
8 March – Kai Pahlman, footballer (b. 1935)
9 March – Max Jakobson, diplomat and journalist (b. 1923)
14 March – Mirja Hietamies, cross country skier (b. 1931).
26 June – Henrik Otto Donner, composer, musician and music personality (b. 1939)
13 October – Antti Tyrväinen, biathlete (b. 1933).
7 December – Eero Kolehmainen, cross country skier (b. 1918).
29 December – Eero Mäntyranta, cross country skier and Olympic winner (b. 1937).

References

 
2010s in Finland
Finland
Finland
Years of the 21st century in Finland